Sperchontidae is a family of prostigs in the order Trombidiformes. There are at least 3 genera and about 19 described species in Sperchontidae.

Genera
 Apeltosperchon
 Sperchon Kramer, 1877
 Sperchonopsis Piersig, 1896

References

Further reading

 
 
 
 

Trombidiformes
Acari families